5-Formiminotetrahydrofolate is an intermediate in the catabolism of histidine. It is produced by glutamate formimidoyltransferase and then converted into 5,10-methenyltetrahydrofolate by formiminotransferase cyclodeaminase.

References

Folates
Coenzymes